Emerald Cities Collaborative (ECC) is a national non-profit organization based in Washington, D.C. with affiliate offices in Boston, Los Angeles, New York, Oakland, San Francisco and Seattle. Founded in 2009, Emerald Cities has the stated goal of creating "high-road" local economies that are sustainable, just and inclusive.  The collaborative comprises more than 21 national organizations and focuses on retrofitting urban building stock, developing infrastructure, and promoting diverse local economies built around energy efficiency.

Services 
Emerald Cities runs a number of programs oriented towards sustainability and energy efficiency, including the RENEW Multi-family Program, the Community College Initiative, and an online training program for small and minority contractors on energy efficiency and renewable energy retrofitting. The organization also engages in workforce development, providing labor-community partnerships, training programs, and career pipelines to pair qualified individuals with green jobs. These programs include the Architecture, Construction and Engineering Students (ACES) Pathway Program and Skills Build us, a construction apprenticeship assistance program and a contractor academy for minority businesses in Boston.  Additionally, Emerald Cities advocates locally and nationally for policy supporting efficient infrastructure and contracting that includes minority-owned businesses.

Chapters 
The Emerald Cities Collaborative has chapters in the following cities:

 Boston
 Los Angeles
 New York City
 Oakland
 San Francisco
 Seattle

Board 

 Bronze Investments
 Building and Construction Trades Department, AFL-CIO
 On Wisconsin Strategy
 Community Action Partnership
 The Corps Network
 Council of Large Public Housing Authorities
 Enterprise Community Partners
 Green For All
 International Brotherhood of Electrical Workers
 International Union of Painters and Allied Trades
 Laborer International Union of North America
 The Local Initiatives Support Corporation
 MIT Community Innovators Lab
 NeighborWorks America
 Partnership For Working Families
 PolicyLink
 United Association of Plumbers and Pipefitters
 YouthBuild USA

Affiliates

Donors 
Donors to the Emerald Cities Collaborative include:

 Annie E. Casey Foundation
 Atlantic Philanthropies
 Nathan Cummings Foundation
 The Joyce Foundation
 The Kendeda Fund
 The Kresge Foundation
 Living Cities
 The Rockefeller Foundation
 Surdna Foundation

Partner organizations 

 AFL-CIO Center for Green Jobs
 Building Futures
 C-Change Investments
 California Construction Academy
 Change to Win Federation
 Civic Ventures
 DC Project
 Detroiters Working for Environmental Justice
 KGS Buildings, LLC
 National Association for the Advancement of Colored People
 Pantheon Properties
 PA State Representative John Siptroth
 United Steelworkers
 US Green Building Council
 Wider Opportunities for Women

References 

 Emerald Cities Seattle Demonstrating Sustainable Affordable Housing Through Energy Efficiency | KPLU News for Seattle and the Northwest
 'Glenn Beck': Joel Rogers, Wizard of Emerald Cities | Fox News
 Emerald Cities aims to RENEW suburban city halls, create jobs, cut carbon and utility bills | cleveland.com
 More Than a Drafting Error: Why Scott Walker Is Wrong

Non-profit organizations based in Washington, D.C.
Democracy activists